Lara-B (born Lara Baruca, born August 1, 1979, in Koper, SR Slovenia is a singer who began her career in her early teens. Her musical style combines rock, electronic, industrial and soul.

Baruca began performing in 1992. After performing at various music festivals (MMS '95, Kraška popevka '95, Slovenska popevka '99, EMA '99, MMS '99, Malta Festival '99), she turned her music aspirations mainly to concert stages. She combines her live performances with her studio work, and has created several albums: Hudič izgublja moč in 1997, Kar ne piše in 1999, Beenarni sistem in 2001, Mindhacker in 2005, and X in 2007, which is a compilation consisting mainly of live performances of the previous material, and represents a 10-year anniversary from her debut. She has also written scores for several theatrical performances (Behind that courtain 2002, Confi-dance 2003, Glasba in gib 2004, Tihe resnice 2005). Her musical expression has been expressed in other genres as well (house, ambient, and drum 'n' bass).

Mindhacker

Lara's first major album release was Mindhacker on Menart Records. Paul Flowers, in his review for WUSC-FM in Columbia, South Carolina, call the album a step forward that shows a continued maturity in singing, composition and a new creative edge. When discussing the album, Baruca jokingly alluded to certain aspects of the album being "emo" in appearance. Mindhacker encompasses a great amount of her personal energies and life experiences, dealing with personal loss and growth emotionally.

Photos

References

External links
Official website

Slovenian rock singers
Living people
Slovenian rock musicians
1979 births
21st-century Slovenian women singers
Musicians from Koper
20th-century Slovenian women singers